Dame Joan Henrietta Collins  (born 23 May 1933) is an English actress, author and columnist. Collins is the recipient of several accolades, including a Golden Globe Award, a People's Choice Award, two Soap Opera Digest Awards and a Primetime Emmy Award nomination. In 1983, she was awarded a star on the Hollywood Walk of Fame. She has been recognised for her philanthropy, particularly her advocacy towards causes relating to children, which has earned her many honours. In 2015, she was made a Dame by Queen Elizabeth II for her charitable services. She is one of the last surviving stars from the Golden Age of Hollywood.

Collins was born in Paddington, London and trained as an actress in her teens at the Royal Academy of Dramatic Art. She signed to The Rank Organisation at the age of 17 and had small roles in the British films Lady Godiva Rides Again (1951) and The Woman's Angle (1952) before taking on a supporting role in Judgment Deferred (1952). Collins went under contract to 20th Century Fox in 1955, and in that same year she starred as Evelyn Nesbit in The Girl in the Red Velvet Swing, Elizabeth Raleigh in The Virgin Queen and Princess Nellifer in Land of the Pharaohs, the latter garnering a cult following. Collins continued to take on film roles throughout the late 1950s appearing in The Opposite Sex (1956), Sea Wife (1957) and The Wayward Bus (1957). After starring in the epic film Esther and the King (1960), she was released on request from her contract with 20th Century Fox.

Collins appeared only in a few film roles in the 1960s, notably starring in The Road to Hong Kong (1962), Warning Shot (1967) and Subterfuge (1968). Collins began to take on local roles again back in Britain in the 1970s, appearing in the films Revenge (1971), Quest for Love (1971), Tales from the Crypt (1972) Fear in the Night (1972) and Dark Places (1973), as well as Tales That Witness Madness (1973), Empire of the Ants (1977), which earned her a Saturn Award nomination, The Stud (1978), Zero to Sixty (1978), Game for Vultures (1979) and The Bitch (1979). From 1981 to 1989, she starred as Alexis Colby in the soap opera Dynasty, which made her an international superstar.
It brought her critical acclaim, winning her the Golden Globe Award for Best Actress in a Television Series – Drama in 1982, and earning her a nomination for the Primetime Emmy Award for Outstanding Lead Actress in a Drama Series in 1984.

In the 1990s and 2000s, Collins worked sporadically in acting. She took fewer film roles, most notably appearing in The Flintstones in Viva Rock Vegas (2000) and the TV movie These Old Broads (2001) alongside Elizabeth Taylor, Debbie Reynolds and Shirley MacLaine. She made her comeback to mainstream television in the 2010s, taking on recurring roles in the series Happily Divorced (2011–2013), The Royals (2014–2018), Benidorm (2014–2017) and American Horror Story: Apocalypse (2018). Her first starring film role since the 1980s was The Time of Their Lives (2017), and she has also appeared in various independent films, which includes the critically-acclaimed Gerry (2018).

Early life
Collins was born on 23 May 1933 in Paddington, London, and brought up in Maida Vale, the daughter of Elsa Collins (née Bessant), a dance teacher, and Joseph William Collins, a talent agent whose clients would later include Shirley Bassey, The Beatles and Tom Jones. Her father, a native of South Africa, was Jewish, and her British mother was Anglican. She had two younger siblings, Jackie, a novelist, and Bill, a property agent. She was educated at the Francis Holland School, an independent day school for girls in London.

Collins made her stage debut in the Henrik Ibsen play A Doll's House at the age of nine, and at the age of 16 trained as an actress at the Royal Academy of Dramatic Art (RADA) in London. At the age of 17, Collins was signed to the Rank Organisation, a British film studio.

Acting career

1950s 
After signing with Rank, Collins appeared in many British films. Her feature debut as a film extra playing a beauty contestant in Lady Godiva Rides Again (1951) which featured Diana Dors. Collins followed up with The Woman's Angle (1952) a minor role as a Greek maid. Next was a more significant role as a gangster's moll in Judgment Deferred (1952).

Collins's big break came with a major, highly publicised role as a juvenile delinquent in I Believe in You (1952). Her success in the part led to her initial stardom and the press nickname "Britain's Bad Girl". Her subsequent films whilst under contract to Rank included Decameron Nights (1953) with Joan Fontaine; England's first X certificate drama, Cosh Boy (1953), directed by Lewis Gilbert; Turn the Key Softly (1953), a drama about three women released from prison on the same day; and the boxing saga The Square Ring (1953).

Collins was top-billed in the desert island comedy Our Girl Friday (1953), co starring Kenneth More. She was directed again by Lewis Gilbert in The Good Die Young (1954) with Laurence Harvey and Gloria Grahame. Between films, she appeared in several plays in London including The Seventh Veil (1952), Jassy (1952), Claudia and David (1954), and The Skin of Our Teeth (1954), as well as a UK tour of The Praying Mantis (1953).
In 1954, Collins was chosen by American director Howard Hawks to star as the scheming Princess Nellifer in her first international production, Land of the Pharaohs. The lavish Warner Brothers historical epic was unsuccessful upon release but has been lauded by Martin Scorsese and French critics supporting the auteur theory for numerous elements of its physical production. Danny Peary in his book Cult Movies (1981), selected it as a cult classic. Collins's sultry performance so impressed 20th Century Fox chief Darryl Zanuck that he signed the young star to a seven-year contract with the Hollywood studio.

Collins made her Hollywood film debut in the lavish historical drama The Virgin Queen (1955). The British newcomer was given equal billing with established stars Bette Davis and Richard Todd. The same year, Collins was cast in the starring role of Evelyn Nesbitt in The Girl in the Red Velvet Swing with Ray Milland and Farley Granger. The part had originally been intended for Marilyn Monroe, however problems between Monroe and Fox led to Collins gaining the role.

MGM borrowed Collins for The Opposite Sex (1956), a musical remake of The Women (1939) in which she was cast as the gold digging Crystal, the role played by Joan Crawford in the original. She then starred as a young nun in Sea Wife (1956), top-billed over co-star Richard Burton, followed by the all-star Island in the Sun (1957), which was a major box-office success. The film earned $5,550,000 worldwide, and finished as the sixth-highest-grossing film of 1957. In 1957, she was top-billed over Jayne Mansfield in the film version of John Steinbeck's The Wayward Bus, which despite disappointing reviews was nominated for the Golden Berlin Bear Award at the 7th Berlin International Film Festival. She then starred opposite Robert Wagner in the espionage thriller Stopover Tokyo (1957), and was Gregory Peck's leading lady in the Western drama The Bravados (1958).

The Leo McCarey comedy Rally Round the Flag, Boys (1958) cast Collins as a temptress out to seduce Paul Newman away from Joanne Woodward. Next came the tense crime caper Seven Thieves (1960) opposite Edward G. Robinson and Rod Steiger.

1960s 
In 1960, Collins became increasingly disillusioned with 20th Century Fox when, having been the original choice to play the title role in Cleopatra, the part went instead to Elizabeth Taylor. Collins withdrew from the studio's production of Sons and Lovers, and requested a release from her contract, however she agreed to star in one last film for Fox, top-billed again in the biblical epic Esther and the King (1960).

In 1961, she returned to London to star opposite Bing Crosby and Bob Hope in the last of that film duo's "road" pictures, The Road to Hong Kong (1962). Former "road" leading lady Dorothy Lamour was relegated to a guest appearance in the film. In Italy, Collins starred in Hard Time for Princes (1965); back in the US she played David Janssen's wife in the detective thriller Warning Shot (1967); in the UK she was the leading lady in the spy caper Subterfuge (1968); and made a cameo appearance in the comedy If It's Tuesday, This Must Be Belgium (1969).

In the US, Collins starred opposite her husband in Newley's autobiographical musical Can Heironymus Merkin Ever Forget Mercy Humppe and Find True Happiness? (1969), a decision she later regretted. Then came the female lead in the Italian drama L'amore brave (1969), The Executioner (1970), a thriller with George Peppard, and Up in the Cellar (1970), a quasisequel to Three in the Attic. Although she had made several appearances on interview and game shows in the late 1950s and early 1960s, Collins began her television dramatic career with a guest role in The Human Jungle in 1963. Her notable appearances on American television during the 1960s included playing the villainous Siren in Batman, Run For Your Life, The Virginian, Mission: Impossible, The Man From U.N.C.L.E., and Star Trek; in the latter, she played Edith Keeler in the episode "The City on the Edge of Forever".

1970s 
In the 1970s, Collins remained busy on television. She starred in the TV movies The Man Who Came to Dinner (1972) with Orson Welles and Lee Remick, and Drive Hard, Drive Fast (1973) opposite Brian Kelly. Her many guest appearances during the decade included The Persuaders! alongside Roger Moore and Tony Curtis, Fallen Angels with Susannah York, Space 1999, Orson Welles Great Mysteries, Police Woman, The Moneychangers with Kirk Douglas and Christopher Plummer, Starsky and Hutch, Tattletales, Switch, Future Cop, Ellery Queen, The Fantastic Journey, Baretta and three separate episodes of Tales of the Unexpected. She rounded off the decade playing Cleopatra in an episode of Aaron Spelling's Fantasy Island.
In 1970, Collins returned to Britain and starred in several films, mostly thrillers and horror films: Revenge (1971), as the vengeance-seeking mother of a murdered child; Quest for Love (1971), a romantic science-fiction piece; Tales from the Crypt (1972), a highly successful horror anthology; Fear in the Night (1972), a psychological horror from Jimmy Sangster; Dark Places (1973), a thriller with Christopher Lee; and Tales That Witness Madness (1973), another horror anthology. She went to Italy for the football-themed comedy L'arbitro (1974), to Spain for The Great Adventure opposite Jack Palance and returned to England for yet another horror, playing the mother of a murderous infant in I Don't Want to Be Born (1975).

After two comedies, Alfie Darling (1975) and The Bawdy Adventures of Tom Jones (1976), Collins returned to the US to make what she now refers to as the nadir of her film career, the giant insect science-fiction piece Empire of the Ants (1977). In Italy she was the leading lady in the thriller Fearless (1978); in the US made the lighthearted Zero to Sixty (1978); and back in the UK appeared with Robert Mitchum in The Big Sleep. In 1978, Collins was catapulted back to major stardom in the UK when she starred in the film version of her sister Jackie Collins's racy novel The Stud. It was made for $600,000 and went on to gross over $20,000,000 internationally. At the same time she published her autobiography, Past Imperfect, which went to number 1 in the bestseller charts. The Stud was so successful that a sequel, The Bitch (1979). was hastily arranged. It too was a hit.

After shooting Game for Vultures (1979) opposite Richard Harris and Sunburn (1979) with Farrah Fawcett, Collins returned to the stage for the first time in many years to play the title role in The Last of Mrs. Cheyney (1980) in London's West End.

1980s 

In 1981 Collins accepted a role in the second season of the then-struggling soap opera Dynasty (1981–89), as Alexis Colby, the beautiful and vengeful ex-wife of oil tycoon Blake Carrington (John Forsythe). Dynasty became an enormous worldwide phenomenon, and by 1985 the programme was the number-one show in the United States, beating out CBS rival Dallas, which ranked number two. For her portrayal of Alexis, Collins was nominated six times for a Golden Globe Award (every year from 1982 to 1987), winning in 1983, the same year she was nominated for an Emmy as Best Actress in a Drama Series. In accepting the award, Collins thanked Sophia Loren for turning down the part of Alexis.

Her performance is generally credited as the chief factor in the fledgling show's subsequent rise in the Nielsen ratings to a hit rivalling Dallas. In the 2001 E! True Hollywood Story episode featuring Dynasty, former ABC executive Ted Harbert stated, "The truth is we didn't really believe that we had this thing done as a hit until Joan Collins walked down that courtroom aisle." Co-star Al Corley noted that Collins "just flew" in the role that was "tailor made...just spot on." In Dynasty producer Aaron Spelling's final press interview, he said of Collins: "We didn't write Joan Collins. She played Joan Collins. Am I right? We wrote a character, but the character could have been played by 50 people and 49 of them would have failed. She made it work." In recognition of her new status, in 1983 Collins was honoured with a star on the Hollywood Walk of Fame for career achievement.

Whilst filming Dynasty, Collins starred in the feature film Nutcracker (1982) and the TV movies Paper Dolls (1982), The Wild Women of Chastity Gulch (1982), Making of a Male Model (1983) with Jon-Erik Hexum, Her Life as a Man (1984), and The Cartier Affair (1984) with David Hasselhoff. She made guest star appearances in The Love Boat and Faerie Tale Theatre, and co-hosted an ABC-TV special created for her, Blondes vs. Brunettes. At the age of 50, Collins appeared in a 12-page photo layout for Playboy magazine shot by George Hurrell. With Dynasty at the height of its success, Collins both produced and starred in the smash hit 1986 CBS miniseries Sins, and also in the same year, Monte Carlo.

1990s 
When Dynasty ended in 1989, Collins began rehearsals for her Broadway stage debut, as Amanda in a successful revival of Noël Coward's Private Lives (1990). She subsequently toured the US in the same play and also starred as Amanda in a production in London's West End. In 1991, she also starred for BBC Television in a series of eight individual Noël Coward plays under the title Tonight at 8.30. In 1991, Collins rejoined her co-stars for Dynasty: The Reunion, a miniseries that concluded the cliffhanger ending left after the show's abrupt 1989 cancellation. In the 1990s, Collins continued to star in films including Decadence (1994) and In The Bleak Midwinter (1995).

On American television she made the TV movies Hart to Hart – Two Harts in 3/4 Time (1995), Annie: A Royal Adventure! (1995) and Sweet Deception (1998). She also made guest-star appearances on series such as Roseanne (1993), The Nanny (1996) and Will & Grace (2000), and played a recurring role in seven episodes of Pacific Palisades (1997). She was selected as the cover star for the relaunch of the popular celebrity magazine OK! when it changed from a monthly to a weekly.

In 1999, Collins was cast in the film version of the musical theatre show Joseph and the Amazing Technicolor Dreamcoat,  with Donny Osmond. She then starred opposite Nigel Hawthorne in the film The Clandestine Marriage (1999), which she also co-produced.

2000s
In 2000, Collins replaced Elizabeth Taylor as Pearl Slaghoople, Wilma Flintstone's mother, in The Flintstones in Viva Rock Vegas, a prequel to the Universal Studios live-action film The Flintstones (1994, Taylor had originated the role in the first film). The following year, Collins co-starred with Taylor, Shirley MacLaine and Debbie Reynolds in the television film These Old Broads, written by Reynolds's daughter, Carrie Fisher. In 2002, Collins returned to soap operas in a limited guest run on the American daytime soap Guiding Light. In 2005, actress Alice Krige impersonated Collins in Dynasty: The Making of a Guilty Pleasure, a fictionalised television film based on the creation and behind-the-scenes production of Dynasty.

In early 2006, Collins toured the United Kingdom in An Evening with Joan Collins (US title One Night With Joan), a one-woman show in which she related the highs and lows of her career and life. The show was directed by her husband Percy Gibson, whom she married in 2002. She has continued to tour the world with the show and its sequel Joan Collins Unscripted ever since, including appearances in New York, Las Vegas, Dubai, Sydney, and twice at the London Palladium. In 2006—2007 she also toured North America for 30 weeks in the play Legends! with former Dynasty co-star Linda Evans.

In the mid-2000s, Collins's television work included the hit British television series Footballer's Wives as Eva de Wolffe (2005), the BBC series Hotel Babylon (2006) and Dynasty Reunion: Catfights and Caviar, a 2006 special featuring several of her Dynasty co-stars reminiscing about the original series. Collins guest-starred in They Do It with Mirrors, a two-hour episode of the murder-mystery drama Marple in 2009, as Ruth Van Rydock, a friend of detective Miss Jane Marple. In 2009, Collins presented her own reality television series entitled Joan Collins Does Glamour.

2010s 

In 2010 she joined the cast of the German soap opera Verbotene Liebe (Forbidden Love) for a short run, playing an aristocratic British woman, Lady Joan, who takes a young German prince in tow. Famed for her double act with Leonard Rossiter in the Cinzano advertisements, in 2012 she starred in a Europe-wide commercial for Snickers chocolate bars, alongside Stephanie Beacham. Within a short time the advert was re-edited and Beacham's appearance cut.

She made her first (and, to date, only) venture into pantomime as Queen Rat in Dick Whittington at the Birmingham Hippodrome during the 2010 Christmas season, starring alongside Nigel Havers and Julian Clary. In 2012–2013, she appeared as herself in the US sitcom Happily Divorced. She also lent her voice to the animated feature film Saving Santa (2013).

From 2013 to 2017, Collins had a recurring guest role in the British sitcom Benidorm as Crystal Hennessy-Vass, the fierce CEO of the fictional Solana Hotel Group. From 2014 to 2018, she played the Grand Duchess of Oxford, mother of fictional British Queen Helena (Elizabeth Hurley) in the E! drama series The Royals. In June 2015, Collins backed the children's fairytales app GivingTales in aid of UNICEF, together with others such as Roger Moore, Ewan McGregor, Stephen Fry, Joanna Lumley, and Michael Caine. The same year she starred in the fantasy film Molly Moon and the Incredible Book of Hypnotism.

In 2016, Collins made a cameo appearance as herself in Absolutely Fabulous: The Movie. The following year she returned to the big screen with the starring role in the British comedy-drama The Time of Their Lives, playing a faded Hollywood star. In 2018 she appeared in a critically acclaimed short film, Gerry, for which she won the Best Actress award at the LA Shorts International Film Festival.

In April 2018, Ryan Murphy announced that Collins had joined the cast of American Horror Story for its eighth season American Horror Story: Apocalypse. She first portrayed Evie Gallant, the glamorous and rich grandmother of Evan Peters' character, and later portrayed witch actress Bubbles McGee. In March 2019 she guest-starred in an episode of the new Hawaii Five-O TV-series.

2020s 
In October 2019, she worked on the feature film The Loss Adjuster opposite Luke Goss and Martin Kemp, which was released in late 2020. In 2021, Collins appeared in a short comedy spoof for Comic Relief entitled 2020: The Movie, in which she played Maggie Keenan, the first person to receive a COVID-19 vaccination. Collins was set to star as Adelaide of Maurienne in the historical drama television series Glow and Darkness, alongside Jane Seymour and Denise Richards which she began filming for in 2020; it was set to be released in late 2021. In May 2021, it was announced that Collins would have a role in the musical film Tomorrow Morning, based on the acclaimed musical play of the same name; the film was released in September 2022.

Other ventures

Philanthropy 

Collins has publicly supported several charities for several decades. In 1982, Collins spoke before the U.S. Congress about increasing funding for neurological research. In 1983, she was named a patron of the International Foundation for Children with Learning Disabilities, earning the foundation's highest honour in 1988 for her continuing support. Additionally, 1988 also saw the opening of the Joan Collins Wing of the Children's Hospital of Michigan in Detroit. In 1990, she was made an honorary founding member of the National Society for the Prevention of Cruelty to Children.

In 1994, Collins was awarded the lifetime achievement award from the Association of Breast Cancer Studies in Great Britain for her contribution to breast cancer awareness in the UK. Collins is patron of Fight for Sight; in 2003, she became a patron of the Shooting Star Chase Children's Hospice in Great Britain, while continuing to support several foster children in India, something she has done for the past 35 years. Collins serves her former school, the Royal Academy of Dramatic Art, as the Honorary President of the RADA Associates.

Writing 
Since the late 1990s, Collins has been a regular guest diarist for The Spectator. In 2008, she had a weekly opinions column in The Sunday Telegraph. She continues to write occasionally for the Daily Mail, The Times, The Daily Telegraph and The Lady in the United Kingdom, and Harper's Bazaar in the United States.

Collins has established herself as a successful author. In addition to her bestselling novels, including Prime Time and Love & Desire & Hate, she has also written six lifestyle books, including The Joan Collins Beauty Book, as well as memoirs, including Past Imperfect. To date, she has sold over 50 million copies of her books, which have been translated into 30 languages.

Personal life

Marriages and family 
Collins has been married five times, first to Northern Irish actor Maxwell Reed, whom she married on 24 May 1952 after he allegedly raped her. She divorced Reed in 1956.

In 1959, Collins began a relationship with the then-unknown actor Warren Beatty. They became engaged in 1960, but his infidelity led to their split. Collins revealed in her 1978 autobiography that she became pregnant by Beatty but had an abortion to avoid a scandal that at the time could have seriously damaged their careers.

In 1963, she married actor and singer-songwriter Anthony Newley, with whom she had two children, Tara and Alexander. She wed her third husband, American businessman Ron Kass in 1972, and the couple had a daughter.

After Collins' marriage to Kass ended in divorce in 1983, she married former singer Peter Holm on 3 November 1985 in a ceremony in Las Vegas. After a bitter separation, they were divorced on 25 August 1987.

She married her fifth and current husband Percy Gibson, who is 31 years her junior, on 17 February 2002 at Claridge's Hotel in London.

As of 2019, Collins had three grandchildren.

Collins's younger sister was Jackie Collins, a bestselling author, who died in September 2015. Collins was informed only two weeks before her sister's death about the breast cancer Jackie had suffered from for over six years.

Over the years, Collins has been named "England's most beautiful girl", "the most beautiful woman in the world", and "the world's sexiest woman".

Collins maintains residences in London, Los Angeles, New York City, and France, describing her life in 2010 as being "that of a gypsy".

In 2019, Collins and Gibson escaped a "terrifying" fire at her London flat in Eaton Place. Gibson was able to contain the blaze using a fire extinguisher before the emergency services arrived. Collins was treated for smoke inhalation but was otherwise unharmed and thanked the emergency response crews on social media.

Political views
She was a supporter of the late Prime Minister Margaret Thatcher, and was invited to attend her funeral on 17 April 2013. Collins is also a staunch monarchist, stating "I'm a big monarchist and I love the Queen." In 2004, it was announced she had become a Patron of the UK Independence Party, though she later said this did not necessarily mean she would vote for the party. In 2013 Collins supported British withdrawal from the European Union.

Honours
Collins was appointed Officer of the Order of the British Empire (OBE) in the 1997 New Year Honours for services to drama.

She was advanced to Dame Commander of the Order of the British Empire (DBE) in the 2015 New Year Honours for services to charity.

Bibliography
Memoir
 Past Imperfect: An Autobiography – UK version (1978)
 Katy: A Fight for Life, A Memoir (1982)
 Past Imperfect: An Autobiography – US version (1984)
 Second Act: An Autobiography (1996)
 The World According to Joan (2011)
 Passion For Life: An Autobiography (2013)
 My Unapologetic Diaries by Joan Collins (2021)
Nonfiction
 The Joan Collins Beauty Book (1980)
 My Secrets (1994)
 Health, Youth and Happiness: My Secrets (1995)
 My Friends' Secrets (1999)
 Joan's Way: Looking Good, Feeling Great (2002)
 The Art of Living Well: Looking Good, Feeling Great (2007)

Fiction
 Prime Time, a novel (1988)
 Love and Desire and Hate, a novel (1990)
 Too Damn Famous, a novel (1995) retitled Infamous for US (1996)
 Star Quality, a novel (2002)
 Misfortune's Daughters, a novel (2005)
 The St. Tropez Lonely Hearts Club, a novel (2015)

By other authors
 Joan Collins by John Kercher, Gallery Books (1984)
 Joan Collins: The Unauthorised Biography by Jeff Rovin, Bantam Books (1984)
 Joan Collins, Superstar: A Biography by Robert Levine, Dell Publishing (1985)
 A Touch of Collins by Joe Collins, Columbus Books (1986)
 Portraits of a Star by Eddie Sanderson, Hodder & Stoughton (1987)
 Inside Joan Collins: A Biography by Jay David, Carroll & Graf Publishers, Inc. (1988)
 Hollywood Sisters: Jackie and Joan Collins by Susan Crimp and Patricia Burstein, St. Martin's Press (1989)
 Joan Collins: The Biography of an Icon by Graham Lord, Orion (2007)

Filmography

Film

Television

Theatre
 1946, A Doll's House - Arts Theatre, London
 1952, The Seventh Veil - Q Theatre, London
 1952, Jassy - Q Theatre, London
 1953, The Praying Mantis - UK Tour
 1953, Claudia and David - Q Theatre, London
 1954, The Skin of Our Teeth - Q Theatre, London
 1980-81, The Last of Mrs. Cheyney - Chichester Festival Theatre/Cambridge Theatre, London
 1981, Murder in Mind - Yvonne Arnaud Theatre, Guildford/Theatre Royal, Brighton
 1990–91, Private Lives - Theatre Royal, Bath/Aldwych Theatre, London
 1992, Private Lives - Broadhurst Theatre, New York City
 2000, Love Letters - US Tour
 2001, Over the Moon - The Old Vic, London
 2004, Full Circle - UK Tour
 2006, An Evening with Joan Collins - UK Tour
 2006–07, Legends - North American Tour
 2010, One Night with Joan - Feinsteins at the Regency, New York
 2010–11, Dick Whittington - Birmingham Hippodrome
 2011, One Night with Joan - Australian Tour
 2011–14, One Night with Joan - Leicester Square Theatre, London
 2013, One Night with Joan - UK Tour
 2016, Joan Collins Unscripted - UK Tour
 2019, Joan Collins Unscripted - London Palladium
 2019, Joan Collins Unscripted - UK Tour
 2021, Joan Collins is Unapologetic - UK Tour

Awards and nominations

References

External links

 
 
 
 
 
 
 
 
 Debrett's People of Today
 Joan Collins interview on BBC Radio 4 Desert Island Discs, 22 July 1990

Living people
1933 births
20th-century English actresses
21st-century English actresses
20th Century Studios contract players
Actresses awarded damehoods
Alumni of RADA
Best Drama Actress Golden Globe (television) winners
British monarchists
Conservative Party (UK) people
English autobiographers
English expatriates in France
English expatriates in the United States
English film actresses
English people of South African-Jewish descent
English socialites
English soap opera actresses
English stage actresses
English television actresses
English television producers
English voice actresses
English women novelists
Dames Commander of the Order of the British Empire
People educated at Francis Holland School
People from Maida Vale
Actresses from London
Writers from London
20th-century English women writers
21st-century English women writers
National Society for the Prevention of Cruelty to Children people
English women non-fiction writers
Women autobiographers
British women television producers